Brachystephanus nimbae is a species of plant in the family Acanthaceae. It is found in Cameroon, Ivory Coast, Ghana, Guinea, and Liberia.

References

nimbae
Vulnerable plants
Taxonomy articles created by Polbot
Taxobox binomials not recognized by IUCN